Candamo (Asturian: Candamu) is a municipality in the Autonomous Community of the Principality of Asturias, Spain. It is bordered on the east by Las Regueras, on the south by Grado, on the north by Illas, Castrillón and Soto del Barco, and on the west by Pravia and Salas.

History
Around Candamo and specially on the shores of the Rio Nalon many  paleolithic artifacts have been found.
The first documentations about Candamo are from the 11th century  and was found in an Monasterys Archive.

Coat of arms 
 Left: the coat of arms from Grado.
 Right: a symbol for the boards, Don Pelayo used, to build a bridge over the river, to cross with his soldiers.

Parishes

Politics

Demography

Points of interest 

 El palacio de Valdés Bazán, from 17th century
 La casa de la Torre,
 El palacio de Cañedo
 El palacio de los Casares in San Tirso

See also 
Instituto Nacional de Estadística (Spain)

References

External links
Postal codes 
Federación Asturiana de Concejos 

Municipalities in Asturias